Quentin Duane Wheeler (born January 31, 1954) is an American entomologist, taxonomist, author and newspaper columnist, and is the founding director of the International Institute for Species Exploration. He was the fourth President of the State University of New York College of Environmental Science and Forestry, in Syracuse, New York until his retirement. Other positions have included: professor of entomology at Cornell University and Arizona State University; Keeper and Head of Entomology at the Natural History Museum in London; and Director of the Division of Environmental Biology at the National Science Foundation.

Education 
Wheeler holds bachelor (1976), master's (1977) and Ph.D. (1980) degrees in entomology from Ohio State University. His Ph.D. dissertation is titled, "Comparative morphology, cladistics, and a revised classification of the genera Lymexylidae (Coleoptera), including descriptions of two new genera".

Career 

Wheeler was a faculty member for 24 years at Cornell University, where he earned the rank of tenured full professor. He was chair of entomology and director of the Liberty Hyde Bailey Hortorium at Cornell. Wheeler also previously served as the Keeper and Head of Entomology at the Natural History Museum in London from 2004–2006, and was director of the Division of Environmental Biology at the National Science Foundation from 2001-2004.

Wheeler joined Arizona State University in 2006. He was the Virginia M. Ullman Professor of Natural History and the Environment, and founding executive director of the International Institute for Species Exploration. Wheeler served as interim dean of the Division of Natural Sciences in 2006, and in 2007 was appointed to the position of vice president and dean of the College of Liberal Arts and Sciences, a position he held until 2011. He was President of the State University of New York College of Environmental Science and Forestry from January 2014 through June 2018.

Research 

Wheeler's research career has focused on the role of species exploration and natural history collections in the exploration and conservation of biodiversity; theory and practice of phylogenetic systematics and cybertaxonomy; the evolution and classification of insects, especially beetles; and public science education. He has received a number of academic honors, including fellowships from the American Association for the Advancement of Science, Linnean Society of London and Royal Entomological Society. He has had three species of beetles named in his honor, such as Tonerus wheeleri, Eleodes wheeleri, and Agathisium wheeleri.

He is the author of approximately 150 scientific articles and six books, including What on Earth? – 100 of Our Planet's Most Amazing New Species. He has named more than 100 new species and writes a periodic column on new species for The Guardian newspaper in London.

Key works 

Articles
Among Wheeler's most highly cited articles are:

 
 
 
 

Books
Wheeler's most widely held books include:

 Wheeler, Quentin D., and Meredith Blackwell, eds. 1984. Fungus-insect relationships: perspectives in ecology and evolution. New York: Columbia University Press. 
 Novacek, Michael J., and Quentin Wheeler, eds. 1992. Extinction and phylogeny. New York: Columbia University Press. 
 Wheeler, Quentin D., and Rudolf Meier, eds. 2000. Species concepts and phylogenetic theory: a debate. New York: Columbia University Press. 
 Wheeler, Quentin D., eds. 2008. The New Taxonomy. Boca Raton: CRC Press. 
 Knapp, Sandra, and Quentin D. Wheeler, eds. 2009. Letters to Linnaeus. London: Linnean Society of London. 
 Wheeler, Quentin D., and Sara Pennak. 2013. What on Earth? 100 of our planet's most amazing new species. New York: Plume. 
 Williams, David, Schmitt, Michael, and Quentin Wheeler, eds. 2016. "The future of phylogenetic systematics: The legacy of Willi Hennig".  Cambridge: Cambridge University Press.

See also 
 List of heads of the New York State College of Forestry
 Phylogenetics
 Taxonomy

References

Further reading 
“President Who Ousted 3 Chairs Will Step Down”
Jackson, Nicholas. (2011, November 18). "A Conversation With Quentin D. Wheeler, Sustainability Scientist," The Atlantic Magazine. 
 Tobin, Dave. (2013, November 15). "SUNY ESF's next president, Quentin Wheeler, is a bug expert," The Post-Standard.
 World Future Society. (n.d.). "The Futurist Interviews Quentin Wheeler, Biologist, on the Future of Biodiversity."

External links 
 Wheeler, Quentin. (2010 - ). "New to nature" (column), The Guardian, UK
 

1954 births
American entomologists
American non-fiction environmental writers
American science writers
American taxonomists
Arizona State University faculty
Cornell University faculty
Leaders of the State University of New York College of Environmental Science and Forestry
Living people
United States National Science Foundation officials
Natural History Museum, London
Ohio State University College of Food, Agricultural, and Environmental Sciences alumni
Phylogenetics researchers
Scientists from New York (state)
State University of New York College of Environmental Science and Forestry faculty
The Guardian people